The ash-breasted sierra finch (Geospizopsis plebejus) is a species of bird in the family Thraupidae.

It is found in Argentina, Bolivia, Chile, Ecuador, and Peru. Its natural habitats are subtropical or tropical dry shrubland, subtropical or tropical high-altitude shrubland, and subtropical or tropical high-altitude grassland.

References

ash-breasted sierra finch
Birds of the Andes
ash-breasted sierra finch
Taxonomy articles created by Polbot